St. Luke African Methodist Episcopal Church, is a historic African Methodist Episcopal Church located at 8435 Main Street in Ellicott City, Maryland.

The building was constructed in 1889.

See also

Asbury Methodist Episcopal Church (Annapolis Junction, Maryland)
Brown Chapel United Methodist Church
First Baptist Church of Elkridge
Hopkins United Methodist Church
Locust United Methodist Church
Mt. Moriah Lodge No. 7
St. Stephens African Methodist Episcopal Church

References

African-American history of Howard County, Maryland
Howard County, Maryland landmarks
Churches in Ellicott City, Maryland
Churches completed in 1889
African Methodist Episcopal churches in Maryland